Lafita is a surname. Notable people with the surname include:

Ángel Lafita (born 1984), Spanish footballer
Eugenio George Lafita (1933–2014), Cuban volleyball coach

See also
Lafata